Iraqi Airways Company, operating as Iraqi Airways, is the national carrier of Iraq, headquartered on the grounds of Baghdad International Airport in Baghdad. It is the second oldest airline in the Middle East. Iraqi Airways operates domestic and regional services; its main base is Baghdad International Airport.

History

Early history
Iraqi Airways was founded in 1945 as a department of the Iraqi State Railways and started operating on 28 January 1946 using five De Havilland Dragon Rapides on a service to Syria. With the help of the British Overseas Airways Corporation (BOAC), the new airline ordered three Vickers Viking aircraft. While waiting for the Vikings to be delivered, it leased four Douglas DC-3 aircraft from BOAC in December 1946. In 1947, the airline ordered the de Havilland Dove to replace the Dragon Rapides; the Doves were delivered in October 1947. The three new Vikings were delivered at the end of 1947 and the DC-3s returned to BOAC. A fourth Viking was bought second-hand.

In 1953, the four-engined Vickers Viscount turboprop was chosen to replace the Vikings and an order for three was placed in July. The Viscounts entered service in 1955 and operated all of Iraqi Airways' international services, including a new route to London with intermediate stops. On 1 April 1960, the airline was split from the railway company. In 1961, it placed an order for two Boeing 720Bs for delivery in 1964, but the order was later cancelled.

In the 1960s, Iraqi Airways bought Russian Tupolev Tu-124 planes as well as Hawker Siddeley Trident aircraft. These jets allowed the airline to increase services across the Middle East, to Africa and Europe. At the time, cargo aircraft such as the Ilyushin Il-76 were also purchased. During the 1970s, Iraqi Airways needed a bigger jet for a new route to John F. Kennedy International Airport in New York; it purchased the Boeing 707 and, soon after, the Boeing 747. Airfare was kept artificially low through state subsidies under the Iraqi Ba'athist government.

Later history
Attempts were made to restart domestic services after the Gulf War in May 1991, and permission was granted by the United Nations to operate helicopters on limited domestic services. Fixed-wing flights were banned under the ceasefire terms, although the UN Security Council agreed to the resumption of domestic flights. These restarted in January 1992 from Baghdad to Basra, using Antonov An-24 aircraft. Operations were suspended shortly after, following a UN ruling.

However, domestic flights became a rarity too, because of the no-fly zone imposed by the United States and United Kingdom over Iraqi skies. During the 1990s, Iraqi Airways would occasionally fly pilgrims to Muslim religious cities.

Revival 

After the War in Iraq, on 30 May 2003, Iraqi Airways announced plans to resume international services. The rights to the Iraqi Airways name was transferred to a new and separate company called Iraqi Airways Company, which would establish a new airline and protect it from the legal problems tied to Saddam Hussein's regime. Operations restarted on 3 October 2004, with a flight between Baghdad and Amman.

Iraqi Airways operated the first domestic commercial scheduled service since the fall of Saddam Hussein's regime, from Baghdad to Basra, with 100 passengers in a Boeing 727-200, on 4 June 2005. On 6 November 2005, Iraqi Airways operated a flight from Baghdad to Tehran, Iran, for the first time in twenty-five years. The aircraft, as with the rest of the fleet, was operated on its behalf by Teebah Airlines of Jordan. Services to Erbil and Sulaymaniyah were added in summer 2005.

In June 2009, it was revealed that Iraqi Airways had struck a deal with British aviation authorities to resume direct from Baghdad to London Gatwick Airport; the flights were supposed to begin on 8 August 2009 using a Boeing 737-400 leased from Tor Air and would eventually have seen the Airbus A320-200 operating the route. This did not happen as planned, however. The airline said at the time that they intended on a bigger expansion into the UK and Europe.

In November 2009, Blue Wings, a German airline, began operating flights to Düsseldorf and Frankfurt, Germany on behalf of Iraqi Airways.

On 25 April 2010, Iraqi Airways launched flights to Gatwick Airport via Malmö, Sweden. When the first flight landed at London, a Kuwaiti lawyer had the General Director Kifah Hassan's documents and passport seized, as well as the plane itself. There were no developments, however, as the plane was owned by the Swedish company Tor Air. The plane returned to Baghdad. However, Kifah Hassan was not allowed to leave the United Kingdom and went up in court on 30 April. Kuwaiti officials demanded £780 million for the planes stolen by Saddam Hussein in the 1990 invasion.

On 26 May 2010, Amer Abdul-Jabbar, Iraq's transport minister, said the cabinet had decided on Tuesday to dissolve the company over the next three years and pursue private options to avoid asset claims made by Kuwait over their 1990–91 war.

In February 2012, Iraqi Airways announced that it would resume flights to India, with services to Delhi or Mumbai from Baghdad.

In April 2012, it was announced that Iraqi Airways had ordered 40 new Boeing aircraft, the order consisting of 30 737-800 and 10 787. The first aircraft would be delivered in December 2012. Airbus in early December delivered its first A330-200 to Iraq, while Boeing delivered a Boeing 777 around the same time as well.

On 14 August 2013, Iraqi Airways took delivery of their first Boeing 737-800 directly from Boeing Company.

In June 2014, Iraqi Airways suspended services to Mosul due to the capture of the city by ISIL.

On 8 September 2015, Iraqi Airways received a loan of $2 billion from a Citibank to finance the purchase of 40 modern aircraft type Boeing 777 and Boeing 787 Dreamliner.

The airline opened a Request For Proposals (RFP) to European airlines with a valid AOC certification in late 2019. The goal was to obtain agreements to wet lease aircraft that can serve routes between Iraq and Europe.

In 2019, Iraqi Airways saw the resumption of flights to Syria, between Damascus and Baghdad.

Livery 

In 2008, Iraqi Airways introduced a new blue colour livery, replacing the previous green shades associated with the Saddam era. The new scheme was only applied to a single Bombardier CRJ; later on, another CRJ received the former green livery, apparently reverting to the previous one. However, in 2012 Iraqi Airways adopted a new green livery which was applied fleet-wide.

Iraqi Airways is one of the few airlines that do not serve alcoholic beverages on their flights.

Destinations 

In March 2009, Iraqi Airways began its first flights to Sweden in almost 19 years.

In September 2009, the airline resumed flights to Bahrain and Doha, Qatar.

In October 2009, Iraqi Airways resumed flights to Karachi, Pakistan. The airline also started seasonal (Hajj) flights to Jeddah.

After revealing the previous month that it had applied for rights to fly to Malmö, Sweden, Iraqi Airways commenced flights to the city on 28 November 2009.

Fleet

Current fleet

, the Iraqi Airways fleet consists of the following aircraft:

Fleet development

In May 2008, the Iraqi government signed a $2.2 billion contract with Boeing for 30 Boeing 737-800s with an option for an additional 10. It was also working on a deal involving the order of ten Boeing 787 Dreamliners aircraft for long-range service.

Another contract worth $398 million was signed for ten Bombardier CRJ-900ER aircraft with ten options. The first CRJ-900ER was delivered in October 2008. This resulted in a lawsuit against Bombardier by Kuwait Airways. Kuwait claims to have won $1.2 billion in judgments against Iraqi Airways as a result of the Gulf War. The Canadian judge ruled that he did not have jurisdiction because the case involved a foreign government, given that the purchaser of the aircraft was the government of Iraq, not Iraqi Airways. The lawsuit by Kuwait Airways was settled in 2009, with Iraq agreeing to pay $300 million.

In February 2010, Iraqi Airways announced major fleet plans, including converting 10 of the 30 orders for the Boeing 737-800 to additional wide bodies as well as bringing the delivery date forward to September 2011, and changing the 10 Boeing 787 Dreamliner orders to Boeing 777 aircraft.

Former fleet

 Airbus A300B4-203
 Airbus A300-600RF
 Antonov An-12BP
 Antonov An-24
 Boeing 707-320C
 Boeing 720-051B
 Boeing 727-200
 Boeing 737-200
 Boeing 737-300
 Boeing 737-400
 Boeing 737-700
 Boeing 747-200C
 Boeing 747-200F
 Boeing 747-400
 Boeing 747SP
 Boeing 757-200
 Boeing 767-200
 Boeing 767-300ER
 de Havilland Dove
 de Havilland Dragon Rapide
 Fokker 70
 Hawker Siddeley HS-121 Trident 1E
 Ilyushin Il-76MD
 Lockheed L-1329 Jetstar
 McDonnell Douglas DC-10-10
 Tupolev Tu-124V
 Tupolev Tu-134
 Vickers VC.1 Viking
 Vickers Viscount

Five Kuwait Airways Airbus A310-200s were seized in 1990 and re-registered in Iraq as part of Iraqi Airways; however, these never flew any commercial flights for the airline. Iraqi Airways also ordered five Airbus A310-300s in the late 1980s, but war-related sanctions prevented their delivery.

Accidents and incidents 

Iraqi Airways' was subject to incidents during the American-Led Gulf Wars with the last occurring on 25 December 1986. In modern day, has seen significant improvements amongst their fleet and operations. The airline has had the following incidents, accidents and hijackings since it began operations in 1945:
 On 4 February 1955, de Havilland Dove YI-ABJ crashed following an engine fire in Al-Mansuriya, Iraq.
 On 10 October 1955, a Vickers 644 Viking 1B overran the runway at Baghdad and crashed into a ditch, where it caught fire. All nineteen passengers and crew survived, but the aircraft was written off.
 On 19 March 1965, a Vickers 773 Viscount crashed into a row of lamp posts at Cairo after a flight from Baghdad. All passengers and crew survived, but the aircraft was written off.
 On 17 April 1973, a Vickers 735 Viscount performed a belly landing at Mosul International Airport after running out of fuel. All 33 passengers and crew survived, but the aircraft was written off.
 On 1 March 1975, a Boeing 737-200 flying from Mosul to Baghdad was hijacked by three hijackers. There was one death on board.
 On 23 September 1980, an Ilyushin Il-76 cargo aircraft flying from Paris to Baghdad crashed while on approach to Baghdad International Airport. It is believed the aircraft was shot down by Iranian fighter jets.
 On 24 September 1980, an Antonov An-24TV was reportedly destroyed on the ground at Kirkuk Airport during heavy fighting.
 On 22 April 1982, an Antonov An-24B crashed while on approach to an Iraqi airfield. The left wing hit the ground, causing the aircraft to crash. 
 On 28 August 1982, the undercarriage of an Antonov An-24TV collapsed on takeoff from Nasiriyah Airport. Everyone on board survived, but the aircraft was written off.
 On 16 September 1984, Iraqi Airways Flight 123, a Boeing 737-200C flying from Larnaca to Baghdad was hijacked by three hijackers All the passengers and crew survived.
 On 25 December 1986, Iraqi Airways Flight 163, a Boeing 737-200C flying from Baghdad to Amman experienced a hijack attempt while flying over Saudi Arabia. Four hijackers tried to enter the cockpit as the aircraft was flying at FL260. Two explosions went off, resulting in a crash near Arar, Saudi Arabia killing 63 of the 106 on board.
 During the Persian Gulf War, two Iraqi Airways Tupolev Tu-124Vs parked on the ground were destroyed by U.S. bombs.

References

External links 

 Iraqi Airways Official English Website 
 Iraqi Airways Official UK Website 
 Iraqi Airways Official Arabic Website 
 Iraqi Airways Company Website- Ministry of Transportation
 Iraqi Airways Website (Unknown) (in Arabic)
SITA E-Commerce (Official Iraqi Airways booking website) 

 
Airlines of Iraq
Airlines banned in the European Union
Arab Air Carriers Organization members
Airlines established in 1946
Government-owned airlines
Government-owned companies of Iraq
1946 establishments in Iraq
Iraqi brands